, son of regent Tadahiro  with his wife Shimazu Kyoko, was a kugyō or Japanese court noble of the late Edo period (1603–1868). He did not hold any regent position kampaku or sesshō. His consort was Shimazu Mitsuko, an adopted daughter of Shimazu Nariakira, eleventh head of Satsuma Domain. The couple had a daughter, Konoe Hiroko, who later married Tokugawa Iesato, the sixteenth head of Tokugawa family and bore him Tokugawa Iemasa, the seventeenth head of the Tokugawa clan. He adopted a son of Konoe Tadahiro as their son Atsumaro. He predeceased his father at the age of 36. His son Hidemaru was adopted by Tsugaru Tsuguakira, the last daimyō of the Hirosaki Domain.

References
 

1838 births
1873 deaths
Fujiwara clan
Konoe family